Antti Viitikko (born 29 November 1976 in Espoo) is a male badminton player from Finland. Viitikko played badminton at the 2004 Summer Olympics in men's singles, losing in the round of 32 to Shon Seung-mo of Korea.

References

External links
Athlete profile

1976 births
Living people
Sportspeople from Espoo
Finnish male badminton players
Badminton players at the 2004 Summer Olympics
Olympic badminton players of Finland